The following is a list of notable performers of rock and roll music or rock music, and others directly associated with the music as producers, songwriters or in other closely related roles, who have died in the 1970s. The list gives their date, cause and location of death, and their age.

Rock music developed from the rock and roll music that emerged during the 1950s, and includes a diverse range of subgenres. The terms "rock and roll" and "rock" each have a variety of definitions, some narrow and some wider. In determining criteria for inclusion, this list uses as its basis reliable sources listing "rock deaths" or "deaths in rock and roll", as well as such sources as the Rock and Roll Hall of Fame.

See also
List of deaths in rock and roll (1950s)
List of deaths in rock and roll (1960s)
List of deaths in rock and roll (1980s)
List of deaths in rock and roll (1990s)
List of deaths in rock and roll (2000s)
List of deaths in rock and roll (2010s)
List of deaths in rock and roll (2020s)

References

1970s-related lists
Rock and roll (1970s)
Deaths 1970s